Vishwajeet Pradhan (born 11 September 1965) is an Indian and television actor who has worked in Hindi films and television.

Incidents on sets
A major fire broke out on the sets of  No Problem while the unit was shooting in the middle of the sea for a vital action sequence. Pradhan was in a scene where he is supposed to raise panic over the fire and try to save himself. While he caught fire, hurting his leg, everyone thought it was a part of his act and complimented his acting skills! But as soon as everyone realized what was happening, Pradhan was saved from any further injury by prompt action. Sunil Shetty also suffered burns on his hands. The fire extinguishers on the sets proved to be very handy. Suniel Shetty and Vishwajeet Pradhan almost became victims of severe burns. A hurt Pradhan said, "These things happen and despite all the precautions, the fire was just uncontrollable because of the sea breeze. My trousers were very thin. I guess it’s part of the game, but I am in pain right now. After the incident, I went to a doctor and even a skin specialist for treatment."

Another incident happened on sets of Rakht Charitra. Pradhan was apparently shooting the climax sequence for the film where his character was supposed to be shot dead. However the blast in the shot was so intense that he had a huge cut along his jaw line that required surgery. After the incident, he was admitted to an emergency ward and later shifted to the normal ward. A surgery was carried out later with a reconstructive plastic surgery carried out to hide the scar. The sequence in question was apparently a normal blast scene that went haywire as the impact was very powerful, hitting the actor in the face, leaving him bleeding. Naturally, the actor and his wife were worried as the wounds require serious attention.

Personal life
He is married to a fashion designer Sonalika Pradhan. They have two children, daughter Dhruvika and son Ojas.

Partial filmography

Television

References

External links

Living people
Indian male film actors
Indian male television actors
Punjabi people
1965 births
Indian male soap opera actors
20th-century Indian male actors
21st-century Indian male actors
Place of birth missing (living people)